Manssinte Theerdha Yathra is a 1981 Indian Malayalam film, directed by Thamban. The film stars Shubha, Sukumaran, M. G. Soman and Jagathy Sreekumar in the lead roles. The film has musical score by M. B. Sreenivasan.

Cast
Shubha as Arundathi
Sukumaran as Kamal
M. G. Soman as Aravindan
Jagathy Sreekumar as Arjunan
Aranmula Ponnamma as Muthassi
Bhagyalakshmi as Seetha 
G. K. Pillai as Raghunathan
Nanditha Bose as Dakshyayani
T. P. Madhavan as Thomas Mathew 
Sreenivasan as Ravi

Soundtrack
The music was composed by M. B. Sreenivasan and the lyrics were written by O. N. V. Kurup.

References

External links
 

1981 films
1980s Malayalam-language films